Sheldon College is a private day school located in Sheldon in Redland City, Queensland, Australia. The school admits students from 15 months of age through to Grade 12.

History 

Lyn Bishop, the founder of Sheldon College, was previously the Principal of Alexandra Hills State High School and the Deputy Executive of Education Queensland. She established the school in 1997 with a team of 6 staff and approximately 100 students. Sheldon College has since grown to become one of the largest schools in Redland City.

In 2021 Lyn Bishop announced that she was stepping down as Principal after 25 years. Sheldon College Board Chair Mr. Chris Wigan announced that Ms. Kate Mortimer had been appointed as the new Principal, commencing in January 2022.

Facilities 

The layout of Sheldon College currently includes two libraries, a multi-purpose venue encompassing conference rooms and sporting facilities; and the LINQ Precinct, a study and teaching facility.

Partnerships and related organizations 

Academically, the school is a regular competitor at the Australian Space Design Competition, having won four straight national titles from 2011 to 2015. Sheldon has also represented the Australian national team participating in the International Space Settlement Design Competition from 2012 to 2014, being part of the winning team in 2012.

In 2006 the school founded and continues to run the Australian School of the Arts (ASTA) program through which, 62 Sheldon College instrumentalists performed as part of the concert band at the 2008 Summer Olympics in Beijing.  
A number of artists, including jazz musician James Morrison, beatboxer Joel Turner, and singer-songwriter Mark Sholtez have held concerts and workshops at the school.

Houses 
Sheldon College includes the following four sporting houses

Notable students and staff

Students 
Exodus Lale, performer and Young Artist Award winner

Alumni 
Sam Heazlett, cricketer for the Queensland Bulls
Elliott Himmelberg, Australian Rules Football Player for Adelaide Crows

Staff 
Adam Lopez, vocalist and previous Guinness World Record holder

Board members 
Don Seccombe, former Queensland cricketer and Mayor of Redland Shire

References

External links 
 
MySchool Profile

Schools in Queensland
Private schools in Queensland
Schools in South East Queensland
Educational institutions established in 1997
1997 establishments in Australia
The Associated Schools member schools